The 2011 World Marathon Cup was the 14th edition of the World Marathon Cup of athletics and were held in Daegu, South Korea, inside of the 2011 World Championships.

Results

See also
2011 World Championships in Athletics – Men's Marathon
2011 World Championships in Athletics – Women's Marathon

References

External links
 Official World Cup Results Marathon - M and Official World Cup Results Marathon - W (Internet Archive)

World Marathon Cup
World
International athletics competitions hosted by South Korea
2011 in South Korean sport
Marathons in South Korea